Lawrence Leroy Piersol (born October 21, 1940) is a senior United States district judge of the United States District Court for the District of South Dakota.

Early life and education
Born in Vermillion, South Dakota, Piersol received a Bachelor of Arts degree from the University of South Dakota in 1962 and a Juris Doctor from the University of South Dakota School of Law in 1965.

Career
Piersol attended The Judge Advocate General's Legal Center and School at the University of Virginia and entered Judge Advocate General's Corps, United States Army, where he served in from 1965 to 1968. He was in private practice in Sioux Falls, South Dakota from 1968 to 1993. A member of the Democratic Party, he served in the South Dakota House of Representatives, serving as Minority Whip (1971 to 1972) and Majority Leader (1973 to 1974).

Federal judicial service
On August 6, 1993, Piersol was nominated by President Bill Clinton to a seat on the United States District Court for the District of South Dakota vacated by Donald James Porter. Piersol was confirmed by the United States Senate on November 20, 1993, and received his commission on November 22, 1993. He served as chief judge from 1999 to 2005 and assumed senior status on July 31, 2009.

References

External links

1940 births
Living people
People from Vermillion, South Dakota
Judges of the United States District Court for the District of South Dakota
United States district court judges appointed by Bill Clinton
United States Army officers
University of South Dakota alumni
Politicians from Sioux Falls, South Dakota
University of South Dakota School of Law alumni
20th-century American judges
21st-century American judges
The Judge Advocate General's Legal Center and School alumni
United States Army Judge Advocate General's Corps